Gegen den Wind (Against the Wind) is a German television series which ran from 1994 to 1997.

Cast
  as Nik Andersen
 Hardy Krüger junior as Sven Westermann
 Alexander Haugg as Knut
 Henry van Lyck as John Westermann
 Daniela Ziegler as Christine Andersen
 Dennenesch Zoudé as Sarah
 Hendrik Martz as Tjard
 Antonio Putignano as Rocky
 Katrin Weisser as Martina
 Ivana Kansy as Iwana
 Patrick Harzig as Dennis
 Eva Habermann as Paula
 Detlef Bothe
 Türkiz Talay
 Bianca Amato

External links
 

1994 German television series debuts
1997 German television series endings
German-language television shows
Das Erste original programming
Surfing mass media